Megachile semicandens is a species of bee in the family Megachilidae. It was described by Theodore Dru Alison Cockerell in 1910.

References

Semicandens
Insects described in 1910